CIL may refer to:

Artists 
 CIL Chen, a Chinese artist and writer

Computers
 C Intermediate Language, a simplified subset of the C programming language
 Common Intermediate Language, a part of the Microsoft .NET runtime
 Computer and Information Literacy, a study of computer competence among students and teachers worldwide.

Organisations
 Canadian Industries Limited, a chemical company best known for their explosives manufacturing and paints
 Centers for Independent Living, an American disabled persons' advocacy group
 Centre for International Law (CIL), part of the National University of Singapore
 Chicago, Indianapolis and Louisville Railway, a railway in Indiana, also known as the Monon Railroad
 Christadelphian Isolation League, a Christadelphian non-profit organisation
 Coal India Limited, an Indian state-owned coal company
 Commissioners of Irish Lights, the lighthouse authority for Ireland
 Crucible Industries LLC, the US steel producer of CPM steels
 COFCO International Limited, is the overseas agribusiness platform for COFCO Group

Places
 Cil, Azerbaijan, a municipality in Lankaran Rayon
 Cil, a village in Almaș Commune, Arad County, Romania
 Cil, Armenia, a municipality in Armenia
 CIL (Casablanca), a quartier of Casablanca, Morocco

Other
 Corpus Inscriptionum Latinarum, a collection of ancient Latin inscriptions
 Customary international law, those aspects of international law that derive from custom
 Community Infrastructure Levy, a type of planning gain
 Council Airport, airport code CIL
 Cash-in-lieu, a financial term used in the settlement of certain exchange traded options
 Cil, a fictional Foundation universe planet
 Cil, an abbreviation of "Comments in line"